The Kangy Angy Maintenance Centre is a railway depot at Kangy Angy on the Central Coast, New South Wales to maintain the NSW TrainLink D sets. The depot was officially opened on 24 February 2021, and is located off Enterprise Drive.

It runs 24/7 and is operated by UGL Rail under a 15-year contract.

History
In 2017, Transport for NSW awarded a contract to John Holland to build a new depot adjacent to the Main Northern line at Kangy Angy to maintain the NSW TrainLink D sets. Construction commenced in May 2018 with the depot.

Major construction was completed in 2020 and the first D set arrived at the facility in October 2020. The facility was officially opened on 24 February 2021.

References

External links

New Intercity Fleet Maintenance Facility - Transport for NSW
John Holland project website

NSW TrainLink
Proposed rail infrastructure in Australia
Railway workshops in New South Wales